Human rights in Zambia are addressed in Zambia's constitution. However, the Zambia 2012 Human Rights Report of the United States Department of State (one of the United States' Country Reports on Human Rights Practices) noted that in general, the government's human rights record remained poor. The 2021 version of this report noted improvements in many areas.

Serious abuses

The Zambia 2012 Human Rights Report of the US State Department noted the following serious human rights abuses:
 abuses by security forces, including unlawful killings, torture, and beatings; 
 life-threatening prison conditions; 
 restrictions on freedom of speech, assembly, and association;media freedom, noting levels of intolerance and harassment of journalists had increased in the year 2016 and suspensions of Itezhi-Tezhi radio station and MuviTV .
 arbitrary arrest and prolonged pretrial detention; 
 arbitrary interference with privacy; 
 government corruption;
 violence and discrimination against women, child abuse, and trafficking in persons; 
 discrimination against persons with disabilities and based on sexual orientation;
 restrictions on labor rights, forced labor, and child labor; and
 that the government generally did not take steps to prosecute or punish officials who committed abuses, allowing impunity to remain a problem.
 unlawful arrests and application of wrong charges on wrong cases .Eg the treason case of Hakainde Hichilema in 2017.
Public access to information: The law does not provide for public access to government information.
Corruption and lack of transparency in government.
Arbitrary or unlawful interference with privacy, family, home, or correspondence.

Freedom in the World ratings

The following are Zambia's ratings since 1972 in the Freedom in the World reports, published annually by Freedom House (1 is best, 7 is worst).

Freedom of the press 

Freedoms of expression and of the press are constitutionally guaranteed in Zambia, but the government frequently restricts these rights in practice. Although the ruling Patriotic Front has pledged to free state-owned media—consisting of the Zambia National Broadcasting Corporation (ZNBC) and the widely circulated Zambia Daily Mail and Times of Zambia—from government editorial control, these outlets have generally continued to report along pro-government lines. Many journalists reportedly practice self-censorship since most government newspapers do have prepublication review. The ZNBC dominates the broadcast media, though several private stations have the capacity to reach large portions of the population.

The rights group Freedom House, which publishes annual country reports on press freedom status, has ranked Zambia’s press as “Not Free” even in 2016.

See also 

Human trafficking in Zambia
Internet censorship and surveillance in Zambia
LGBT rights in Zambia

Notes 
1.As of January 1.

References

External links
 Human Rights in the Republic of Zambia , Amnesty International.
 Freedom in the World 2013 Booklet, Freedom House.

 
Zambia
Politics of Zambia